The Father of the Bride franchise consists of a series of released comedy and romantic comedy films, based on the premise of the 1949 novel of the same name. The film adaptations respectively depict the events of wedding preparations from the point of view of an overly-protective father, and his growing realizations that his daughter has grown.

Developed by MGM in 1950 as a comedy, the original film was critically and financially successful, and was followed by a sequel in 1951. In 1991, The Walt Disney Company purchased the film rights to the story and adapted a romantic comedy remake through its Touchstone Pictures film studio. The time-period for which was shifted to be a contemporary adaptation. It was also followed by a sequel in 1995. Though the remakes were not critically acclaimed releases, they have subsequently gained cult status within their respective genre. A third installment, "mini-sequel", was filmed during the COVID-19 pandemic and was released on September 25, 2020, to support World Central Kitchen's efforts in relieving those effected by the coronavirus.

A reboot of the franchise was developed at Warner Bros. Pictures as an exclusive for the company's HBO Max streaming service and was released on June 16, 2022.

Origin 

The 1949 satirical comedy novel, Father of the Bride, written by Edward Streeter serves the inspiration for the film adaptations.

The story centers around Stanley Banks and his troublesome attempts to adapt to his daughter's engagement. The story provides readers with insight into the mind of an overprotective father, and the comedic scenarios that follow. Stanley is a working man, who has to pay the expensive bill for a wedding he doesn't accept wholeheartedly. Over the course of the story, he has a change of heart and comes to understand that he must welcome the next phase of life. Illustrations for the book were provided by Gluyas Williams.

Films

Father of the Bride (1950) 

When the doting, middle-class working, father Stanley Banks, learns that his beautiful daughter Kay is engaged to Buckley Dunstan, a series of comical difficulties arise. Stan navigates a range of wedding planning problems ranging from monetary to emotional, all while his wife Ellie tries to keep the peace and remain calm. His love for his daughter grows as Stan realizes he is the father of the bride, and that she has grown up.

Father's Little Dividend (1951) 

One year following the wedding of their daughter, Stanley and Ellie Banks are surprised with news that their daughter Kay is pregnant. While everyone fawns over Kay and the excitement of the upcoming newborn, Stan retrieves as he is not yet ready to be a grandfather. When the family continues to prepare for the coming baby's nursery and debates over what name it shall have, Stan finds himself being the one that Kay turns to for help because of his mellow facade. In helping his daughter realize that she is ready to be a mother, Stan realizes that he too can find excitement in the coming events.

Father of the Bride (1991) 

A remake released in 1991, the events of the plot were updated for a contemporary audience. Though the critical reception upon release was mixed, the movie has subsequently been deemed a romantic comedy "cult classic" film.

George Banks and his wife Nina, are the proud doting parents of their daughter Annie. They are both surprised when she returns home from studying abroad, and announces that she is engaged to a man she met in Rome, Italy. George's whole world turns upside down, as the overprotective father copes with advancing to his daughter's next stage of life. Nina's excitement contrasts and equals the apprehension of George. The pair quickly navigates the wedding preparations including, meeting the in-laws, an eccentric wedding planner and his flamboyant assistant named Franck and Howard respectively. When things continue to move at a pace out of his control, George comes to terms with the reality that his daughter has grown up and happily walks her down the aisle.

Father of the Bride, Part II (1995) 

A sequel to Father of the Bride (1991), and a partial remake of Father's Little Dividend, Part II picks up where the previous installment left off. The sequel received a less favorable critical reception than its predecessor but once again became a romantic comedy cult classic movie, albeit this time.

As George adjusts to the reality that his daughter is married and that his son Matty is growing up, he initiates plans to sell his home with retirement in mind. Annie announces that she is pregnant. Upon realizing that he will become a grandfather, George must come to terms with that fact that he is aging. Not ready to be a senior citizen, George begins a series of comical events associated with a midlife crisis. Amid these events George receives even more surprising news, when his wife Nina reveals that she is also expecting a baby. Realizing that he will go from being the father of the bride to the father of the newborn, George navigates preparations for the two babies. The family receives assistance from the eccentric Franck Eggelhoffer in planning the baby showers and preparing the nursery. Throughout these events, George realizes that he will get to experience the joys of parenthood with Nina all over again, with his upcoming baby. He repurchases his home and finds excitement in fathering his baby daughter, Megan.

Father of the Bride, Part 3(ish) (2020) 
Developments for a third installment began as early as 1996, following the release of Father of the Bride Part II. Though the second film did not perform as well as the first movie, Charles Shyer and Nancy Meyers were confirmed to return in their respective roles. The project however, remained in various stages of development hell since its inception. In February 2014, Hollywood Reporter Nikki Fink exclusively reported that the script was finished, and would center around the wedding of Matty Banks. He stated that the character would be gay, and that the story would center around George coming to terms with his son's sexuality. Steve Martin seemingly debunked the report, one day later. By October 2017, George Newbern stated that a script written by Charles Shyer had been completed. Various actors from the first two films, expressed interest at different times in returning for a third film. Following reports that The Walt Disney Company is rebooting the franchise, talks of a third film dissipated.

In September 2020, Nancy Meyers announced a follow-up to the first two films was coming. The first teaser trailer was released on September 23, with an official preview released the following day. The "mini-sequel" was written and directed by Meyers, with the plot including a family reunion over Zoom at the request of Matty Banks, and depicted George Banks' reaction to 2020. Steve Martin, Diane Keaton, Kimberly Williams-Paisley, Kieran Culkin, George Newbern, and Martin Short reprised their respective roles, with Alexandra Shipp and Robert De Niro joining. The film benefited World Central Kitchen charity, supporting families and children who suffer due to the COVID-19 pandemic. Father of the Bride 3(ish) was released on September 25, 2020, exclusively through Netflix while also streaming on the service's YouTube and Facebook pages.

Father of the Bride (2022) 

In September 2020, it was announced that a Latin adaptation centered around Cuban-Americans is in development with a script written by Matt Lopez. By February 2021, Gaz Alazraki signed on as director. Andy García starred as Guillermo "Billy" Herrera, the titular character in addition to serving as executive producer, while Jeremy Kleiner and Dede Gardner served as producers. The project is intended to be a joint-venture production between Warner Bros. Pictures, and Plan B Entertainment with HBO Max distributing. It was released on June 16, 2022.

Future

Untitled reboot film 
In February 2018, it was announced that various remakes were in development from The Walt Disney Company for their Disney+ streaming service, drawing from their library of intellectual properties. One of the projects named in the announcement was Father of the Bride. As of 2023, no further development has surfaced.

Main cast and characters

Additional crew and production details

Reception

Box office and financial performance

Critical and public response

See also 
 Guess Who's Coming to Dinner
 Guess Who
 Why Him?
 List of romantic comedy films

References 

Father of the Bride (franchise)
depicting the events of pregnancy
Touchstone Pictures franchises